2 Penkuttikal ( English : Two Girls ) is a 2016 Indian Malayalam film directed by Jeo Baby. It stars Anna Fathima and Shambavi in the lead roles with cameo appearances from Amala Paul, Tovino Thomas, and Anju Kurian. Fathima won Kerala State Film Award for Best Child Artist for her role in the film.2 Penkuttikal was screened at the Odisha International Film Festival and Busan Kids and Youth International Film Festival.

Plot
The film discusses issues faced by young girls and women in today's society. Achu and Anagha are close friends, who decide to bunk their class to visit a mall in the city. Their visit to the city changes their life and what happens next forms the crux of the film.

Cast

Anna Fathima as Younger Achu
 Amala Paul as Older Achu
 Shyambhavi Suresh as Younger Anagha
 Anju Kurian as Older Anagha
 Tovino Thomas as Sanju, Anagha's boyfriend
 Priya Shine as Achu's Mother
 Kiran Aravindakshan as Malayalam Teacher
 Chinchu Mohan as Anagha's Mother
 Shine Thankam Raj as Achu's Father
 Suresh as Principal
 Ardra as Sindhu
 Safvan as Anagha's Father
 Shiju Kuruvila as Police Inspector
 Anand Thiruvannoor as Police Constable

Music

The music of the film was composed by Mathews Pulickan. Lyrics was penned by Jobi Moozhiyankan Joseph and Gilu Joseph and the songs are sung by Mrithul, Haritha Balakrishnan and Leah Anne Philip.

Release 
The film was released on 22 January 2016 in theaters across Kerala.

Reception

The film was screened at the following film festivals & received accolades.

 BUFF International Film Festival, Sweden - The film was selected to be shown to school going teenagers in Sweden
 International Open Film Festival, Bangladesh - Best Children's Film
 Socially Relevant Film Festival, New York - Women Critic Circle Award
 LOVE International Film Festival, Los Angeles - Best International Film
 Lola Kenya International International Film Festival, Kenya
 Odisha International Children's Film Festival of India

References

External links
 

2016 films
2010s Malayalam-language films
Indian children's films
2016 directorial debut films
Films directed by Jeo Baby